is a Japanese military fiction media franchise. Created by Yoshiyuki Tomino and Sunrise (now Bandai Namco Filmworks), the franchise features giant robots, or mecha, with the name "Gundam".  The franchise began on April 7, 1979, with Mobile Suit Gundam, a TV series that defined the "real robot" mecha anime genre by featuring giant robots called mobile suits (including the original titular mecha) in a militaristic setting. The popularity of the series and its merchandise spawned a franchise that includes 50 TV series, films and OVAs as well as manga, novels and video games, along with a whole industry of plastic model kits known as Gunpla which makes up 90 percent of the Japanese character plastic-model market. 

Academics in Japan have viewed the series as inspiration; in 2008, the virtual Gundam Academy was planned as the first academic institution based on an animated TV series.

As of March 2020, the franchise is fully owned by Bandai Namco Holdings through subsidiaries Sotsu and Sunrise. By 2022, annual revenue of the Gundam franchise reached ¥101.7 billion per year, ¥44.2 billion of which was retail sales of toys and hobby items.

Overview

Concept
Mobile Suit Gundam was developed by animator Yoshiyuki Tomino and a changing group of Sunrise creators with the collective pseudonym of Hajime Yatate. The series was originally entitled Freedom Fighter Gunboy (or Gunboy) for the robot's gun, with teen boys the primary target demographic. Early production had a number of references to freedom: the White Base was originally "Freedom's Fortress", the Core Fighter was the "Freedom Wing" and the Gunperry was the "Freedom Cruiser". The Yatate team combined the English word "gun" with the last syllable of the word "freedom" to form the portmanteau Gundom. Tomino changed it to Gundam, suggesting a unit wielding a gun powerful enough to hold back enemies like a hydroelectric dam holding back water. In keeping with the concept, Gundams are depicted as prototypes or limited-production, with higher capabilities than mass-produced units.

Most Gundams are large, bipedal, humanoid vehicles controlled from a cockpit by a human pilot. The cockpit is located in the torso, while the head serves as a camera to transmit images back to the cockpit. Most of the series protagonists are Newtypes, genetically advanced humans adapted for space. Newtypes have psychic abilities that enable them to sense each other across space and to utilize special mobile suits.

The series itself has been described as a space opera.

Innovation
Mobile Suit Gundam reportedly pioneered the real robot subgenre of mecha anime. In contrast to its super robot cousins, Mobile Suit Gundam attempted realism in its robot design and weaponry by running out of energy and ammunition or malfunctioning. Its technology is derived from actual science (such as Lagrange points and the O'Neill cylinder in space, and the use of Helium-3 as an energy source) or feasible technology requiring only a few fictional elements to function (such as Minovsky Physics).

Timelines
Most of the Gundam animation (including the earliest series) is set in what is known as the Universal Century (UC) calendar era, with later series set in alternate calendars or timelines. Although many new Gundam stories are told in their parallel universe with independent timelines (giving them greater creative freedom), the original UC storyline continues to be popular. It established the series, setting the standard for hard science fiction in anime; the original Gundam marked the maturing of the giant-robot genre. Nostalgia for the oldest Gundam shows (and its status as a pop-culture icon in Japan) is a factor in its continuing success.

Spinoffs
SD Gundam, a spinoff of Gundam which began during the mid-1980s, features super deformed designs and emphasizes comedy and adventure. Model Suit Gunpla Builders Beginning G, Gundam Build Fighters, and Gundam Build Divers feature contemporary settings and use Gunpla as plot elements.

Media

TV series, films, and video
Except for Mobile Suit Gundam 00, which follows the current calendar era, all Gundam series are set in a fictional era, begin after a drastic event or chain of events, and typically involve a major conflict between Earth and space colonies (and in some cases the Moon and terraformed planets). An exception are Gundam Build timelines, which are set in an alternate present time where all other Gundam installments are fictional.

Live-action film
At the 2018 Anime Expo, Legendary Pictures and Sunrise announced a collaboration to develop a live-action Gundam film. Brian K. Vaughan was brought in to write and serve as an executive producer for the film. In April 2021, it was reported that the project had landed at Netflix and that Jordan Vogt-Roberts had been hired to direct.

Manga and novels

Manga adaptations of the Gundam series have been published in English in North America by a number of companies, such as Viz Media, Del Rey Manga and Tokyopop, and in Singapore by Chuang Yi.

Video games

Gundam has spawned over 80 video games for arcade, computer and console platforms, some with characters not found in other Gundam media. Some of the games, in turn inspired spinoff novels and manga. Most Gundam video games, except Dynasty Warriors: Gundam, were released only in Japan.

Gundam models

Hundreds of Gundam models, primarily made of plastic but sometimes with resin and metal detail parts, have been released. They range in quality from children's toy kits to hobbyist and museum-grade models, and most are in 1:35, 1:48, 1:60, 1:100 or 1:144 scale. Promotional 1:6 or 1:12 scale models are supplied to retailers and are not commercially available. For Gundam 30th anniversary, a full-size RX-78-2 Gundam model was constructed and displayed at Gundam Front Tokyo, in the Odaiba district; it was taken down on March 5, 2017. A new statue of the Unicorn Gundam was erected at the same location, now renamed The Gundam Base Tokyo.

Other merchandise
Bandai, Gundam primary licensee, produces a variety of products. Other companies produce unofficial merchandise, such as toys, models and T-shirts. Products include Mobile Suit In Action (MSiA) action figures and Gundam model kits in several scales and design complexities. Each series generally has its own set of products, MSiA and model lines such as Master Grade and High Grade Universal Century may extend across series. The most popular action-figure line has been the Gundam Fix series, which includes the mecha in the animated series, manga and novels and accessories to create an updated version. In addition to Master Grade and High Grade Gundams, Bandai released a 30th-anniversary series of Gundam models in 2010. The Real Grade (RG) Gundam series combined the Master Grade's detailed inner structure with additional colour separation, making the 1:144-scale series complex in design and compact in size. After the introduction of the RG Gundam series, Bandai released the Metal Build series in March 2011 (beginning with the 00 Gundam).

Internet
Bandai maintains several websites to promote Gundam projects; Gundam Perfect Web is the official Japanese site. Its English-language counterpart is the US-maintained Gundam Official. In 2005, the website hosted the Gundam Official User Forum. The forum was based on the existing fan forum, Gundam Watch, using many of its staff. When the project was retired, Gundam Watch was reborn and became Gundam Evolution.

A number of series-specific websites have been created, often available for a limited time (usually to promote a DVD release). Common content includes character and mecha listings, lists of related merchandise and pay-for-download content. Special pages are frequent, often presenting downloadable wallpaper or a small game. The Superior Defender Gundam Force website has a game in which players take the role of villain Commander Sazabi, attempting to blast his subordinate with weapons.

Global spread
Since 1980, Gundam has also appeared in the following countries and regions:

Impact

Gundam is a Japanese cultural icon; it is a ¥50-billion-annual business of Bandai Namco, reaching ¥54.5 billion annual revenue by 2006, and  annual revenue by 2014. Stamps were issued, an Agriculture Ministry employee was reprimanded for contributing to the Japanese Wikipedia Gundam-related pages, and the Japan Self-Defense Forces code-named its developing advance personal-combat system Gundam.

The impact of Gundam in Japan has been compared to the impact of Star Wars in the United States.

See also
Bandai Museum
Mobile Suit Gundam
Gundam (fictional robot)

References

External links

Official Gundam website

Gundam at the Mecha Anime Headquarters website'
Gundam Perfect Games 
Bandai Visual's Gundam minisite  

 
Mass media franchises introduced in 1979
Fiction about asteroid mining
Bandai brands
Bandai Namco franchises
Bandai Visual
Mass media franchises
Military anime and manga
Military fiction
Military science fiction
otaku
Sunrise (company)
Space opera anime and manga